Agyrtidia uranophila is a moth of the subfamily Arctiinae. It was described by Francis Walker in 1866. It is found in São Paulo in Brazil and in Peru.

References

Moths described in 1866
Arctiinae of South America
Fauna of Brazil
Moths of South America
Arctiinae